Sniadecki is a lunar impact crater on the far side of the Moon. This is a circular, bowl-shaped feature that is not overlain by any significant impacts. However the larger satellite crater Sniadecki Q is attached to the southwestern outer rim and has disrupted the rim edge somewhat. There is also a small crater attached to the western outer rim.

To the northeast of Sniadecki is a small lunar mare feature that has been designated Lacus Oblivionis. To the northwest of Sniadecki is the crater Bok.

Satellite craters
By convention these features are identified on lunar maps by placing the letter on the side of the crater midpoint that is closest to Sniadecki.

See also 
 1262 Sniadeckia, asteroid

References

 
 
 
 
 
 
 
 
 
 
 
 

Impact craters on the Moon